The Battle of Arnee (or Battle of Arni) on 3 December 1751 during the Second Carnatic War. A British-led force under the command of Robert Clive defeated and routed a much larger Franco-Indian force under the command of Raza Sahib.

Background 
The loss of the capital Arcot significantly damaged the prestige of Chandra Sahib and his French allies. Despite the victory, however, the Carnatic region remained a highly contested in the ongoing struggle between the British and the French for hegemony.

Battle 
Less than three weeks after Arcot, Clive encounter the Franco-Indian force near the small town of Arni, about twenty miles south of Arcot on December 3rd. Raza Sahib's army, having retired to nearby Vellore, had been reinforced by the French. On the other hand, Clive's forces had been supplemented by the Marathas under Morari Rao, who had been convinced that the price offered for their participation was high enough.

Clive drew his men up in a defensive position on a small hill behind flooded rice fields with only a narrow causeway for access. On the right he deployed his sepoys in the shelter of a small village, and on the left the Maratha cavalry in a palm grove. On midday, French and Indian forces attacked Clive under cover from several cannons firing on the British position. Clive’s artillery fire proved more effective and forced the French vanguard to move along the causeway with their artillery, making them easy targets for Clive’s guns.

As Raza Sahib's forces approached the village, they came under intense fire from the sepoys and retreated to take shelter in the lower rice fields, where they became bogged down under fire. Panic set in and they floundered about in disarray and retreated. To the left, however, a contingent of Raza Sahib’s troops advanced towards the Maratha position. The Marathas launched one cavalry charge after another to push them back, the well-disciplined French-led troops repulsed them up to five times.

Clive ordered two guns forward to support the Marathas; in the rush, the ammunition was forgotten, and Clive had to order the gunners to retreat to fetch it – but to do so slowly, so as not to give the impression that the British were retreating. Puzzled by the maneuver, French commanders assumed that Clive had ordered reinforcements to capture their exposed guns on the causeway. Raza Sahib ordered part of his force away from the left flank to secure them, which the Marathas immediately exploited by launching a successful attack on the French and Indian cavalry and driving them back. Concurrently, the sepoys now attacked the French reinforcements sent to protect the guns, who were already trapped by musket fire from the protected positions in the village. 

The remainder of Clive's forces on the hill now attacked the troops down the causeway. At first, the French and Indians fought back furiously and tried to make a stand three times, but they were relentlessly pushed back. The Marathas forced them back on their left flank, and succeeded in capturing Raza Sahib’s war chest of 100,000 rupees; the Maratha attacks continued to the night, when Clive’s forces finally broke off the assault. By dawn on the next day, Sahib's forces were gone. Their baggage, along with the dead and wounded strewn about the battlefield.

Aftermath 
Clive's victory at Arni was distinct from that at Arcot of resisting a siege. It was a classical military victory accomplished through good tactics, discipline and resourcefulness. So thorough was the triumph that hundreds of enemy sepoys defected to Clive, who happily accepted many of them. In so doing he believed that on the evidence provided by the combination of victories at Arcot and Arni the British position had been solidified enough to allow for the declaration of a regional victory, and for him to happily return to Madras.

References

Bibliography
 Faught, B. (2013). Clive: Founder of British India. Dulles Town Center, VA: Potomac Books.
Harvey, R. (2014). Clive: The life and death of a British emperor. Thomas Dunne Books.
Sandler, S. L. (Ed.). (2002). Ground Warfare: An International Encyclopedia, volume 1. Oxford, England: ABC-CLIO.

Battles involving France
Battles involving Great Britain
Conflicts in 1751
1751 in India
French East India Company
Battles involving the British East India Company
Battles involving the French East India Company
Battles of the Second Carnatic War
History of Tamil Nadu